, known professionally as , is a Japanese writer, radio personality, actor, and voice actor. Kajita is a writer and radio personality for the Japanese gaming news website 4gamer.

Career

While attending a boarding high school, Kajita spent time reading gaming magazines and noticed a job opening for a game writer. After being transferred to a different high school, Kajita spent time on video games, anime, and manga, and attended a vocational school after graduating. He was accepted into  as a writer for the games department, where he was later introduced to Tomokazu Sugita by a senior writer.

Writing credits

Video games

Filmography

Radio

Television

Film

Video games

References

External links
  

1987 births
Living people
21st-century Japanese male actors
Japanese male film actors
Japanese male television actors
Japanese male voice actors
Japanese male writers
Japanese radio personalities